Sé (English: See) is a former civil parish (freguesia) in the city and municipality of Lisbon, Portugal. It had a total area of 0.12 km2 and total population of 1,160 inhabitants (2001); density: 9,586.8 inhabitants/km2. It was created as a parish in 1150. At the administrative reorganization of Lisbon on 8 December 2012 it became part of the parish Santa Maria Maior.

Main sites
Lisbon Cathedral
Casa dos Bicos
Santo António Church

External links
 Sé's parish website

References 

Former parishes of Lisbon